Ayshford is a hamlet and historic manor in the parish of Burlescombe in the district of Mid-Devon, Devon, England. It was anciently the seat of the de Ayshford family.

Ayshford Chapel is a grade I listed 15th century chapel of the Ayshford family.

References

External links

 

Villages in Devon
Grand Western Canal
Historic estates in Devon